Lords Lake may refer to:

Lords Lake (South Dakota), a lake
Lords Lake National Wildlife Refuge, a protected area in North Dakota